Team GrisGris (Japanese: チームグリグリ Hepburn: Chīmu GuriGuri) is a Japanese video game developer and publisher company. The company is most famous for the Corpse Party series.

History 
Team GrisGris began in 1998, as a doujin developer. Without having a publisher, those who wanted to purchase their earlier titles would have to do so through e-mail. Their first officially published game, Corpse Party: Blood Covered, was published by Team GrisGris in 2008, which was a remake of their first game, Corpse Party. Two sequels followed that as well as a remake of the first game, which were published by 5pb. in Japan, and by Xseed Games in North America and Europe.

Titles

References 

Video game companies of Japan
Video game development companies
Video game companies established in 1998
Japanese companies established in 1998